Alexander Calvit (also known as Sandy Calvit) (1784–1836) was an early settler in colonial Texas and a sugar planter. His Evergreen Plantation lay where the town of Clute, Texas, was later built.

Early life
Alexander Calvit was born on June 17, 1784, in what is now Mississippi, which was then part of Spanish West Florida and in 1798 became the Mississippi Territory of the United States. He served as a First Lieutenant and aide-de-camp in the Creek War of 1813–1814.

Career
He was one of the earliest settlers in Mexican Texas, going on Stephen F. Austin's mission. As a member of the Old Three Hundred, in 1824 he received some land in what are now Brazoria and Waller Counties. This included what is now known as Clute, Texas.

He established the Evergreen Plantation, a sugar plantation in what later became known as Clute, Texas.

Personal life
He married Barbara Mackall Wilkinson, sister of Jane Herbert Wilkinson Long, known as "the mother of Texas." Their daughter, Barbara M. W. Calvit, married John Hunter Herndon, a lawyer and a planter. When she inherited her father's plantation, they renamed it the Herndon Plantation and raised Arabian horses and cattle.

Death
He died of pneumonia on January 7, 1836, at his home in Brazoria County (then Brazoria District, Mexican Texas).

References

1784 births
1836 deaths
People from Mississippi
People from Brazoria County, Texas
People of the Creek War
American planters
Deaths from pneumonia in Texas
People of Mexican Texas
Old Three Hundred